Thomas Pratt (born 3 June 1995) is an English footballer who plays for Hyde United.

Career
Pratt began his career with Bury and made his professional debut on 13 April 2013 in a 1–0 defeat against Oldham Athletic, and later went on loan to Mossley in August 2013. He left Bury having mutually terminated his contract on 4 January 2014.

Pratt joined Ashton United on 23 June 2014.

in June 2017 he joined Trafford.

Later that year he moved to Hyde United. and has been there ever since establishing himself as a cult hero at Hyde due to the effort he puts in to every performance

References

External links

English footballers
English Football League players
Bury F.C. players
Mossley A.F.C. players
Ashton United F.C. players
1995 births
Living people
Association football forwards
Trafford F.C. players
Hyde United F.C. players